The 1982 William Jones Cup (sixth tournament) took place in Taipei.The tournament was held in a span of two weeks with the final being held on July 5, 1982.

Final

Standings
 
 
 
4th 
5th 
6th 
7th 
8th 

Source

References

1982
1982 in Taiwanese sport
1981–82 in European basketball
1981–82 in North American basketball
1981–82 in South American basketball
1982 in Asian basketball
1982 in New Zealand basketball